Joseph Mary Plunkett  (Irish: Seosamh Máire Pluincéid; 21 November 1887 – 4 May 1916) was an Irish nationalist, republican, poet, journalist, revolutionary and a leader of the 1916 Easter Rising. Joseph Mary Plunkett married Grace Gifford in 1916, seven hours before his execution.

Background
Plunkett was born at 26 Upper Fitzwilliam Street in one of Dublin's most affluent districts. Both his parents came from wealthy backgrounds, and his father, George Noble Plunkett, had been made a papal count. 

Plunkett contracted tuberculosis (TB) at a young age and spent part of his youth in the warmer climates of the Mediterranean and North Africa. He spent time in Algiers where he studied Arabic literature and language and composed poetry in Arabic. He was educated at the Catholic University School (CUS) and by the Jesuits at Belvedere College in Dublin and later at Stonyhurst College, in Lancashire, England where he acquired some military knowledge from the Officers' Training Corps. Throughout his life, Joseph Plunkett took an active interest in Irish heritage and the Irish language, and also studied Esperanto. Plunkett was one of the founders of the Irish Esperanto League. He joined the Gaelic League and began studying with Thomas MacDonagh, with whom he formed a lifelong friendship. The two were both poets with an interest in theatre, and both were early members of the Irish Volunteers, joining their provisional committee. Plunkett's interest in Irish nationalism spread throughout his family, notably to his younger brothers George and John, as well as his father, who allowed his property in Kimmage, south Dublin, to be used as a training camp for young men who wished to escape conscription in Britain during the First World War.

IRB involvement

Sometime in 1915, Joseph Plunkett joined the Irish Republican Brotherhood and soon after was sent to Germany to meet with Roger Casement, who was negotiating with the German government on behalf of Ireland. Casement's role as emissary was self-appointed, and, as he was not a member of the IRB, that organisation's leadership wished to have one of their own contact Germany to negotiate German aid for an uprising the following year. He was seeking (but not limiting himself to) a shipment of arms. Casement, on the other hand, spent most of his energies recruiting Irish prisoners of war in Germany to form a brigade to fight instead for Ireland. Some nationalists in Ireland saw this as a fruitless endeavour and preferred to seek weapons. Plunkett successfully got a promise of a German arms shipment to coincide with the Rising.

According to Ernest Blythe, Plunkett's republicanism did not prevent him from suggesting, at a briefing of Irish Volunteer organisers in January 1915, that in certain circumstances it would be in Irish interests for a German Catholic prince to be crowned king of Ireland, nor did anyone present object. During the Easter Rising, Plunkett and Patrick Pearse argued in a conversation with Desmond Fitzgerald that it would be beneficial for Prince Joachim of Prussia to be crowned king.

Easter Rising
Plunkett was one of the original members of the IRB Military Committee that was responsible for planning the Easter Rising, and it was largely his plan that was followed. Shortly before the rising was to begin, Plunkett was hospitalised following a turn for the worse in his health. He had an operation on his neck glands (probably goiter) days before Easter and had to struggle out of bed to take part in what was to follow. Still bandaged, he took his place in the General Post Office with several other of the rising's leaders such as Patrick Pearse and Tom Clarke, though his health prevented him from being active. His aide de camp was Michael Collins.

Marriage and execution
Following the surrender, Plunkett was held in Kilmainham Gaol, and faced a court martial. Seven hours before his execution by firing squad at the age of 28, he was married in the prison chapel to his sweetheart Grace Gifford, a Protestant convert to Catholicism, whose sister, Muriel, had married his best friend Thomas MacDonagh, who was also executed for his role in the Easter Rising. Grace never married again.

Aftermath

His brothers George Oliver Plunkett and Jack Plunkett joined him in the Easter Rising and later became important IRA men. His father's cousin, Horace Plunkett, was a Protestant and unionist who sought to reconcile unionists and nationalists. Horace Plunkett's home was burned down by the Anti-Treaty IRA during the Civil War.

Plunkett named his sister, Geraldine, literary executor of his will. She published a volume of his poetry a month after his execution in June 1916.

The main railway station in Waterford City is named after him as was Joseph Plunkett Tower in Ballymun which has since been demolished. Plunkett barracks in the Curragh Camp, County Kildare is also named after him.

In popular culture
The Irish ballad "Grace", written by Seán and Frank O'Meara, is a monologue of Plunkett expressing his love to Grace and his love for the cause of Irish independence in the small hours before his execution. The ballad has been notably covered by Jim McCann.

He is also mentioned in the Irish rebel song “Seán South of Garryowen”.

American composer Florence Turner-Maley used Plunkett’s text in her song “I See Him Everywhere.”

His religious poem "I See His Blood upon the Rose" is well-known in Ireland.

References

Further reading
 Augusteijn, Joost (ed.), The Irish Revolution 1913-1923 (Basingstoke 2002)
 Boyce, George D., Nationalism in Ireland (London 1982)
 Kee, Robert, The Green Flag: A History of Irish Nationalism (London 1972)
 Kelly, Matthew, The Fenian Ideal and Irish Nationalism 1882-1916 (Woodbridge 2006)
 Mansergh, Nicholas, The Unresolved Question: The Anglo-Irish Settlement and its Undoing (New Haven and London 1991)
 Martin, F.X. (ed.), Leaders and Men of the Easter Rising: Dublin 1916 (London 1967)
 Novick, Ben, Concerning Revolution: Irish Nationalist Propaganda during the First World War (Dublin 2001)
 O Brolchain, Honor, Joseph Plunkett (Dublin 2012)
 Plunkett Dillon, Geraldine (edited Honor O Brolchain): All in the Blood (A. & A. Farmar)
 Townshend, Charles, Easter 1916: The Irish Rebellion (London 2005)

External links

Grace – By Seán and Frank O' Meara
The Poems of Joseph Mary Plunkett (1916)

1887 births
1916 deaths
20th-century poets
Executed participants in the Easter Rising
Executed writers
Irish Catholic poets
Irish Esperantists
Irish nationalists
Irish poets
Irish republicans
Members of the Irish Republican Brotherhood
People educated at Belvedere College
People educated at Stonyhurst College
People from County Dublin
Signatories of the Proclamation of the Irish Republic
People educated at Catholic University School